The Champion Lakes are a chain of seven alpine and glacial Paternoster lakes in Custer County, Idaho, United States, located in the White Cloud Mountains in the Sawtooth National Recreation Area.  The lakes are located on the upper portion of the Champion Creek watershed, a tributary of the Salmon River.  The lakes have not been individually named, and lakes 5 and 6 are often dry.  Sawtooth National Forest trail 105 leads to the lakes.  In 2005 the Valley Road Forest Fire burned part of the Champion Lakes Basin.

See also

 List of lakes of the White Cloud Mountains
 Sawtooth National Forest
 Sawtooth National Recreation Area
 White Cloud Mountains

References

Lakes of Idaho
Lakes of Custer County, Idaho
Glacial lakes of the United States
Glacial lakes of the Sawtooth National Forest